The Magnificent Yankee may refer to:
 The Magnificent Yankee (play) (1946), by Emmet Lavery
 The Magnificent Yankee (1950 film), adapted by Emmet Lavery and directed by John Sturges
 The Magnificent Yankee (1965 film), adapted by Robert Hartung, and directed by George Schaefer

See also 
 The Magnificent Yankees, a 1952 book by Tom Meany about members of the New York Yankees